Kearney & Company is a CPA firm established in 1985. It is headquartered in Alexandria, Virginia. It exclusively serves the federal government of the United States. Kearney & Company are the 'independent auditors' of the United States Department of State.

History of the company
Founded in 1985, in 2000 the company sold its commercial business to concentrate exclusively on the federal market. The next decade saw a major increase in the company's business, with annual revenues rising from $5 million to close to $75 million, and staff numbers from thirty to over four hundred. In December 2010 the company was named one of 'Washington's fastest-growing companies'. The company was also among Accounting Today's '2010 Best Accounting Firms to Work For'. In a statement of January 2011 CEO Edward F. Kearney opined "you must create your own demand by delivering … quality of service" and added "my style is to find the right players and give them space to do what they do well". Kearney & Company sponsor the Federal Accounting Handbook, and Ed Kearney is one of the co-authors of this manual. Kearney & Company display on their corporate website the American insignia of the bald eagle and the United States Capitol.

See also
 Auditor independence

References

External links
 Kearney & Company corporate website

Accounting firms of the United States
Companies based in Alexandria, Virginia